General Clinton may refer to:

George Clinton (vice president) (1739–1812), Continental Army brigadier general
Henry Clinton (British Army officer, born 1730) (1730–1795), British Army general
Henry Clinton (British Army officer, born 1771) (1771–1829), British Army lieutenant general
James Clinton (1736–1812), Continental Army brevet major general
William Henry Clinton (1769–1846), British Army general